The 2022–23 Sheffield Shield season is the 121st season of the Sheffield Shield, the domestic first-class cricket competition being played in Australia. The tournament was started in October 2022. Western Australia are the defending champions. The traditional home and away format returned after two seasons. In June 2022, Cricket Australia revealed the fixtures of the tournament.

Points table

Round-Robin stage

Round 1

Round 2

Round 3

Round 4

Round 5

Round 6

Round 7

Round 8

Round 9

Round 10

Final

References

External links
 Series home at ESPNcricinfo

Sheffield Shield
Sheffield Shield
Sheffield Shield seasons